SM UB-143 was a German Type UB III submarine or U-boat in the German Imperial Navy during World War I. She was commissioned into the German Imperial Navy on 3 October 1918 as SM UB-143.

She was surrendered to Japan on 1 December 1918 and served in the Imperial Japanese Navy as O-7 until 1921, when she was broken up in Yokohama.

Construction

Built by AG Weser of Bremen in one year of construction, UB-143 was launched at Bremen on 21 August 1918, carried 10 torpedoes and was armed with a  deck gun. Displacement was  while surfaced and  when submerged. Her engines enabled her to travel at  when surfaced and  when submerged.

References

Notes

Citations

Bibliography 

 

German Type UB III submarines
World War I submarines of Germany
1918 ships
Ships built in Bremen (state)
Foreign submarines of the Imperial Japanese Navy